These are the official Royal Navy Officer ranks ordered by rank. These ranks are part of the NATO/United Kingdom ranks, including modern and past. Past insignia is in italic.


Rank

Officers 

Uniforms for naval officers were not authorised until 1748. At first the cut and style of the uniform differed considerably between ranks, and specific rank insignia were only sporadically used. By the 1790s, the Royal Navy's first established uniform regulations had been published.

Ranks could be indicated by embroidery on the cuffs, by arrangement of buttons or, after 1795, on epaulettes. However, there was no consistent system and insignia might differ between uniforms, and were altered several times. Sometimes there was no specific indication of rank at all.

Midshipmen received a white patch on the collar in 1758, the oldest badge still in use today.

The modern system of gold rings on the cuffs originated on 11 April 1856. For the first time these were consistently applied to all blue uniforms.

On 16 April 1861, mates were commissioned as sub-lieutenants and lieutenants were divided into those of over eight years seniority and those under. As a result, on 5 September 1861 the lower ranks' rings were changed:

and on 25 March 1863 to:

On 30 October 1877, a lieutenant of eight years'/ seniority got an additional half-ring of in, increased to in in 1891, and in 1914 became the new rank of lieutenant commander.

In 1919, the admiral's narrow stripe was reduced to in, but as King George V had not approved the change, the Royal Family continued to wear the wider ring.

In 1931, all the in rings were all increased to in.

The curl was introduced in 1856, but initially only the military (or executive) and navigating (masters) branches wore it.

Other (civil) branches had plain rings, from 1863 with coloured distinction cloth between or below them. Until 1891 officers of the 'civil' branches had single-breasted coats with different arrangements of buttons.

Engineer officers received the curl in 1915 and all other officers in 1918. At the same time they also received other things such as oak leaves on the peaked cap that had formerly been the prerogative of the military branch.

In 1955 it was announced that the distinction cloth worn between the stripes of officers of the non-executive branches of the Royal Navy was to be abolished, except for those who must be clearly recognisable as non-combatant under the Geneva Convention.

The residual use of distinction cloth for non-combatants is therefore:
 Scarlet – medical
 Orange – dental
 Salmon pink – wardmasters (to 1993)
 Silver grey - civilian officers from Royal Corps of Naval Constructors (RCNC)
 Dark green – civilian officers when required to wear uniform

From 1955 to 1993 there was a rank of acting sub-lieutenant, with the same rank insignia as a sub-lieutenant.

Other Fleet Air Arm officers had a letter 'A' inside the curl.

From 1795 rank badges could also be shown on epaulettes. The system changed several times, but after 1864 was as follows:

Sub-lieutenants and commissioned warrant officers wore scales (epaulettes without fringes, officially termed "shoulder straps") and the same device as a lieutenant.

Epaulettes of the military branch were gold throughout with silver devices, while those of the civil branches had a silver edging and gold devices. Instead of the baton and sword or foul anchor, civil branch epaulettes substituted a star. Navigating branch epaulettes were the same as the military branch, but with crossed plain anchors in place of the foul anchor. The epaulette stars had eight points, quite unlike the Order of the Bath stars worn by army officers.

In 1891 the admiral of the fleet changed to a crown above two crossed batons within a wreath, similar to the badge of a field marshal.

Also in 1891 shoulder-straps were introduced for use on white uniforms and on the greatcoat, and more recently in "shirt sleeve order". For these commodores first class and above used the same badge as on their epaulettes, and commodores second class and below used their rank rings.

From 1926 only commodores had two stars, other captains one.

Epaulettes were not worn after 1939.

In 2001, the shoulder boards on dress uniforms were changed and are currently:

Historical insignia

Warrant officers 

Warrant officers first received their uniforms in 1787. The navigators, surgeons and pursers were commissioned in 1843 and their insignia are described above.

In 1865 chief (later commissioned) gunners, boatswains, and carpenters were given a single in ring, with the curl, though the carpenters lost the curl in 1879.

In 1891 ordinary warrant officers of 10 years' standing were given a half-ring of in, with or without curl as above.

In 1918 this ring, with the curl, was extended to all non-commissioned warrant officers.

In 1949 WOs and CWOs became "commissioned branch officers" and "senior commissioned branch officers" and were admitted to the wardroom, but their insignia remained the same.

In 1956 they were integrated into the line officers as sub-lieutenants and lieutenants, and class distinctions finally disappeared from the uniform.

Reserves 

From 1863 officers were commissioned in the Royal Naval Reserve this was for serving merchant navy officers only. They had rings each formed from two  inch wavy lines intersecting each other. The curl was formed into a six-pointed star. The lieutenant commander's half-ring was straight, but only  inch wide. The commodore had a broad straight ring, but the same star for a curl. Midshipmen had a blue collar patch.

Officers of the Royal Naval Volunteer Reserve (formed 1903) for civilians, had single wavy rings  inch wide, with the curl a squarish shape. The lieutenant commander's narrow ring was originally straight, but after 1942 was waved also. This system of rank insignia is still worn today by officers in the Sea Cadets. Midshipmen in the RNVR had a maroon collar patch.

In 1951 both reserves lost their distinctive insignia and got normal straight stripes like the regulars, but with a letter 'R' inside the curl. The two organisations were merged in 1958. In 2007 officers of the Royal Naval Reserve had the 'R' distinction from badges of rank removed. Honorary officers in the RNR however continue to wear the 'R' inside the curl.

Wrens 

Officers in the Women's Royal Naval Service had straight rings in light blue, with a diamond shape instead of the curl. The Women's Royal Naval Service was abolished in 1994 and female officers now have the same gold rings as male officers.

Royal Marines 

Part of the RN as the Senior Service, the Royal Marines uses the same rank structure and insignia that the British Army has, save for the field marshal rank, and the RM initials for second lieutenants to lieutenant colonels to distinguish them from the Army itself. The major general rank since 1996 is the highest rank of the officer corps, but in the past, generals and lieutenant generals headed the Corps, and from 1857 to 1957 the Corps also had the unique ranks of colonel second commandant and colonel commandant. Rank insignia are on brown or dark blue shoulder boards in all dresses save for the combat and barracks duty dress uniforms. From 1911 to 1957 the officer corps even included warrant officers and commissioned warrant officers in the same way as the RN. Although the Royal Marines does not officially use the rank of field marshal, the Captain General Royal Marines, the ceremonial head of the corps, wears a field marshal's rank insignia.

Officer ranks of the Royal Marines 
Historical ranks in italic.

 Warrant officer
 Commissioned warrant officer
 Probationary second lieutenant
 Probationary lieutenant
 Ensign
 Second lieutenant
 Lieutenant
 Captain lieutenant
 Second captain
 Captain
 Junior major
 Senior major
 Major
 Lieutenant colonel
 Colonel
 Colonel second commandant
 Colonel commandant - replaced by 1957 with brigadier
 Brigadier - acting rank, an appointment for colonels. until 1997
 Brigadier general - temporary appointment rather than substantive rank. used from 1913 to 1921
 Major general
 Lieutenant general
 General

See also 
 British Army officer rank insignia
 RAF officer ranks
 Ranks of the cadet forces of the United Kingdom
 Royal Marines Band Service
 Royal Navy other rank insignia

Notes

References

Citations

Sources

External links 
 Archived 2008 Royal Navy official webpage on Uniforms and Badges of Rank
 Illustrations of Naval epaulettes at the National Maritime Museum
 Royal Navy ranks, professions, trades and badges of rank in World War II

British military insignia